Leonbronn is a village in the district of Heilbronn in Baden-Württemberg, Germany.  From 1971 to 1974, Leonbronn together with Ochsenburg formed the local authority of Burgbronn.  The various districts of the latter were incorporated into Zaberfeld on 1 January 1975.

The above is a translation based on the article in the German Wikipedia at :de :de:Leonbronn

Villages in Baden-Württemberg